This is a list of all cricketers who have played first-class or List A matches for Pakistan Automobiles Corporation cricket team. The team played 83 first-class matches between 1983 and 1993 and 69 List A matches between 1984 and 1993. Seasons given are first and last seasons; the player did not necessarily play in all the intervening seasons.

Players

 Aamer Hanif, 1989/90-1993/94
 Aamer Wasim, 1987/88
 Aaqib Javed, 1989/90-1991/92
 Abdullah Khan, 1990/91-1992/93
 Adnan Sabri, 1984/85
 G. M. Ahmed, 1983/84-1984/85
 Arshad Nawaz, 1983/84-1985/86
 Ashfaq Ahmed, 1992/93
 Ata-ur-Rehman, 1990/91-1991/92
 Ayaz Jilani, 1985/86-1991/92
 Basit Ali, 1989/90
 Dara Bashir, 1986/87-1987/88
 Fakhruddin Baloch, 1991/92
 Farrukh Raza, 1986/87-1987/88
 Ghaffar Kazmi, 1983/84
 Ghaffar Khan, 1983/84
 Ghulam Ali, 1990/91-1993/94
 Ijaz Ahmed, 1983/84-1985/86
 Imtiaz Ahmed, 1986/87
 Javed Hayat, 1989/90
 Junaid Alvi, 1983/84-1986/87
 Kamran Khan, 1991/92-1993/94
 Khalid Alvi, 1985/86
 Mahmood Zamir, 1989/90
 Maqsood Raza, 1987/88-1989/90
 Masood Anwar, 1984/85-1986/87
 Mian Fayyaz, 1983/84-1992/93
 Mohammad Aslam, 1993/94
 Mohammad Zahid, 1991/92-1993/94
 Moin Mumtaz, 1983/84-1987/88
 Mujahid Jamshed, 1992/93-1993/94
 Murtaza Hussain, 1992/93-1993/94
 Mustaqeem Ahmed, 1993/94
 Nadeem Ahsan, 1985/86
 Nadeem Khan, 1989/90
 Nadeem Moosa, 1986/87-1987/88
 Najam Wahab, 1986/87
 Ghulam Pasha, 1989/90
 Qaiser Hussain, 1983/84-1985/86
 Rashid Mahmood, 1990/91-1991/92
 Sanaullah Khan, 1983/84-1993/94
 Shahid Anwar, 1987/88-1990/91
 Shahid Hussain, 1993/94
 Shahid Mahboob, 1983/84-1991/92
 Shahid Nawaz, 1989/90-1993/94
 Shahid Pervez, 1983/84-1984/85
 Shahid Saeed, 1991/92-1993/94
 Shahzad Bashir, 1983/84-1985/86
 Shaukat Mirza, 1983/84-1984/85
 Sher Ali, 1986/87-1992/93
 Siddiq Patni, 1985/86
 Sohail Khan, 1983/84
 Tahir Mahmood, 1985/86-1993/94
 Tanvir Ahmed, 1983/84
 Tanvir Khan, 1986/87
 Umar Rasheed, 1983/84-1993/94
 Wasim Akram, 1984/85-1985/86
 Yahya Toor, 1983/84-1993/94
 Zahid Fazal, 1989/90
 Zahoor Elahi, 1986/87-1987/88
 Zulqarnain, 1991/92-1993/94

References

Pakistan Automobiles Corporation cricketers